Daniele Abbracciante (born 8 April 1994) is an Italian footballer who currently plays as a forward.

Biography

Frosinone
Born in Latina, Lazio region, Abbracciante started his career at Lazio club Frosinone, where he played for the club in under 16-17 mixed team in 2009–10 season.

Parma
On 31 August 2010, along with team-mate Mirko Gori, they were signed by Serie A club Parma in temporary deal for €25,000 each, with option to co-contract the player. Abbracciante was a player of under-17 youth team of Parma in 2010–11 season. In June 2011 Parma excised the option to buy half of the registration rights of Abbracciante for €250,000 in a 5-year contract. Abbracciante himself was promoted to the under-20 reserve team in 2011–12 season. He remained in Parma for the reserve in 2012–13 season, but the age limit was decreased to under-19 by Lega Serie A. The co-ownership of the registration rights was renewed in June 2012 and again in June 2013.

On 25 July 2013 he was signed by the third division club L'Aquila in a temporary deal. He made his debut on 4 August 2013 in 2013–14 Coppa Italia, against former club Frosinone. Abbracciante played his first match (and so far last) of the season in round 1 against Prato. He was the substitute of Marco Frediani. In June 2014 Parma acquired Abbracciante from Frosinone outright for free.

Lega Pro clubs
On 1 September 2014 Abbracciante was transferred to Lega Pro club Grosseto. On 9 January 2015 he was transferred to fellow third level club Ischia.

References

External links
 

Italian footballers
Frosinone Calcio players
Parma Calcio 1913 players
L'Aquila Calcio 1927 players
Serie C players
Italy youth international footballers
F.C. Grosseto S.S.D. players
Association football forwards
People from Latina, Lazio
1994 births
Living people
S.S. Ischia Isolaverde players
Footballers from Lazio
Sportspeople from the Province of Latina